Alexandre Flanquart (born 9 October 1989) is a French rugby union player, playing as lock for Provence in the Pro D2.

Career
Alexandre Flanquart began playing professional rugby in 2009 for Stade Français, the club he remains playing for six years later. Even though he signed with Stade Français in 2008, he didn't receive his first appearance until 2009, where he came of the bench on the 74th minute against Bourgoin. On this occasions, Paris were victors 20–6. He became a more consistent player the following season, making 16 appearances overall. His form for his club saw him called up to the French national side for the 2013 France rugby union tour of New Zealand. He earned his first cap on the 8 June, coming of the bench for Yoann Maestri on the 70th minute. His has since then been a regular player in the French camp, being named in the squad for the 2014 and 2015 Six Nations Championship's, plus the 2014 end-of-year rugby union internationals squad.

References

1989 births
Living people
French rugby union players
People from Cambrai
Stade Français players
Union Bordeaux Bègles players
Rugby union props
Sportspeople from Nord (French department)
France international rugby union players
Provence Rugby players